The Hadriwa is a mountain, 677 m above sea level, in the municipality of Zell in the county of Cham in the German state of Bavaria, and the highest point in the region south of Zell between the Perlenbach and Göppenbach streams.

There is another mountain called the Hadriwa in the Bavarian Forest in the county of Straubing-Bogen which is 922 m high.

References 

Mountains under 1000 metres
Mountains of Bavaria
Mountains of the Bavarian Forest
Cham (district)